Sunetra is an Indian actress who worked in Bangladesh, India and Pakistan.

Biography
Sunetra was born on 7 July 1970. She received MA degree from Kolkata University.

Sunetra made her debut in Dhallywood in 1985 with Usila where Zafar Iqbal was her co-star. She mainly acted in Dhallywood films. She acted in Tollywood too. She also acted in two Urdu films and Pakistani television dramas.

Selected filmography

Dhallywood
 Usila
 Boner Moto Bon
 Vabir Songsar
 Sadhona
 Palki
 Raja Mistri
 Sukher Swapno
 Sukher Swapno
 Alal Dulal
 Shuktara
 Sohodhormini
 Kuchboron Konya
 Bondhu Amar
 Shimul Parul
 Vai Amar Vai
 Layla Amar Layla
 Dukhini Ma
 Bidhan
 Nache Nagin
 Vul Bichar
 Sorporani
 Bikrom
 Badsha Vai
 Raja Joni
 Amar Songsar
 Vai Bondhu
 Ghor Vanga Ghor

Tollywood
 Sithir Sidur
 Monsa Konya
 Khelaghar
 Danob

Lollywood
 Talash
 Shunye Ki Talash

References

Living people
1970 births
Indian film actresses
Indian television actresses
Actresses in Bengali cinema
Bengali television actresses
Actresses in Urdu cinema
Actresses in Urdu television
Indian expatriate actresses in Bangladesh
Indian expatriate actresses in Pakistan
University of Calcutta alumni